Fiorentino is one of the 9 communes or castelli of the Republic of San Marino.

Geography 
It borders the San Marino municipalities Chiesanuova, San Marino, Borgo Maggiore, Faetano, and Montegiardino and the Italian municipalities Monte Grimano and Sassofeltrio.

History 
Evidence indicates a settlement existed on the site before Roman times.

Parishes 
Fiorentino has 3 parishes (curazie):
 Capanne, Crociale, Pianacci

References

External links 

 
Municipalities of San Marino